Bush highway may refer to:

 Bush Highway (Arizona)
 President George Bush Turnpike